An integrated workplace management system (IWMS) is an ultimate software platform for organizational uses of workplace resources, including the management of real estate portfolio, infrastructure and facilities assets of a company. IWMS solutions are commonly packaged as an integrated suite or as individual modules that can be scaled over time. They are used by corporate occupiers, real estate services firms, facilities services providers, landlords and managing agents. Traditionally focused on supporting real estate and facilities professionals, IWMS solutions are becoming more employee-centric, expanding their touchpoints to include all building occupants and visitors.

Core functional areas of IWMS 
IWMS tends to integrate five core functional areas (or at least a combination of some of the five) within an enterprise which were organizationally and operationally independent and showed minimal interdisciplinary synergy, before the advent of IWMS:

Real estate management
This area involves activities associated with the acquisition (including purchase and lease), financial management and disposition of real property assets. Common IWMS features that support real estate management include strategic planning, transaction management, request for proposal (RFP) analysis, lease analysis, portfolio management, tax management, lease management, and lease accounting.

Capital project management
This area involves activities associated with the design and development of new facilities and the remodeling or enhancement of existing facilities, including their reconfiguration and expansion. Common IWMS features that support capital project management include capital planning, design, funding, bidding, procurement, cost and resource management, project documentation and drawing management, scheduling, and critical path analysis.

Facilities management
This area covers activities related to the operation and optimized utilization of facilities. Common IWMS features that support facility management includes strategic facilities planning (including scenario modeling and analysis), CAD and BIM integration, space management, site and employee service management, resource scheduling, and move management.

Maintenance management
This area covers activities related to the corrective and preventive maintenance and operation of facilities and assets. Common IWMS features that support maintenance management include asset management, work requests, preventive maintenance, work order administration, warranty tracking, inventory management, vendor management and facility condition assessment.

Sustainability and energy management
This area covers activities related to the measurement and reduction of resource consumption (including energy and water) and waste production (including greenhouse gas emissions) within facilities. Common IWMS features that support sustainability and energy management include integration with building management systems (BMS), sustainability performance metrics, energy benchmarking, carbon emissions tracking, and energy efficiency project analysis.

Implementation Planning
IWMS components can be implemented in any order—or all together as a single, comprehensive implementation—according to the organization’s needs. As an implementation best practice, a phased approach for implementing IWMS components sequentially is advised—though a multi-function approach can still be followed. Each IWMS functional area requires the same steps for its implementation, though extra care, coordination and project management will be necessary to ensure smooth functioning for more complex implementations.

Adoption of as-shipped business processes included in the IWMS software over an organization's existing business processes constitutes a “core success prerequisite and best practice” in the selection and implementation of IWMS software. As a result, organizations should limit configuration to all but the most compelling cases.

Analyst coverage
Since 2004, the IWMS market has been reported on by independent analyst firms Gartner Inc., Verdantix, IWMSconnect and IWMSNews.

Gartner Market Guide for Integrated Workplace Management Systems
Until 2014, Gartner published the IWMS Magic Quadrant, evaluating IWMS vendors on two criteria: 'completeness of vision' and 'ability to execute'. As the market further matured, the Magic Quadrant reports were replaced by an annual Market Guide, focusing more on the development of the market itself than on comparative positioning.

The original author, Michael Bell, first described IWMS software as "integrated enterprise solutions that span the life cycle of facilities asset management, from acquisition and operations to disposition." In this first market definition, Gartner identified critical requirements of an IWMS, including a common database, advanced web services technologies and a system architecture that enabled user-defined workflow processes and customized portal interfaces.

Gartner released updated IWMS Market Guide reports, as follows:

The latest Gartner Market Guide for Integrated Workplace Management Systems was published on January 28, 2020 by Carol Rozwell, Former Distinguished VP Analyst, and Rashmi Choudhary, Principal Analyst.

Verdantix Green Quadrant Integrated Workplace Management Systems 
Since 2017, Verdantix publishes Integrated Workplace Management Systems Green Quadrant reports and Buyer's Guides. The research firm's proprietary Green Quadrant methodology uses weighted criteria for vendor evaluation, grouped under 2 categories: Capabilities (breadth and depth of software functionality) and Momentum (strategic success factors).

Evolution of IWMS 
While the core functions remain critical, IWMS is evolving into a cloud-based software platform that is built with the workplace experience at the center. Providing an interactive user interface across multiple devices, modern IWMS enables employees to access a variety of workplace services from a mobile app, kiosk, or desktop. In the latest Verdantix research, 80% of executives considering IWMS software said the quality of the user interface was the most important factor influencing their decision. 

The IWMS of the future should serve as a digital workplace concierge, allowing employees to find people, reserve rooms, request services and receive mail or visitors.

With the growth of the Internet of Things, a trend that is gaining ground is the integration of IWMS software and Smart Building solutions on a single platform, also termed IWMS+. This allows for IWMS to draw on real-time data from sensors to manage the modern work environment.

See also
Real estate
Facility management
Computer-aided facility management
Enterprise asset management

References

Business software